Tabanus trijunctus is a species of horse fly in the family Tabanidae.

Distribution
The Bahamas, United States.

References

Tabanidae
Insects described in 1854
Taxa named by Francis Walker (entomologist)
Diptera of North America